Cyprus has participated in the biennial classical music competition Eurovision Young Musicians 11 times since its debut in 1988, most recently taking part in 2010. Cyprus has not succeeded in reaching the final in any contest to date.

Participation overview

See also
Cyprus in the Eurovision Song Contest
Cyprus in the Junior Eurovision Song Contest

References

External links 
 Eurovision Young Musicians

Countries in the Eurovision Young Musicians